Love Train – The Philly Album is the fourth studio album by British pop star Sonia. It was released in 1998 only as a promo, because Sonia was unhappy that her lead single from this album - "Wake Up Everybody" merely reached #155 in the UK Singles Chart. The album includes Philadelphia International Records artists' covers. This is Sonia's last studio album until her 2019 EP release.

Track listing
 "Backstabbers" - 3:59
 "You Bring Out the Best in Me" - 3:57
 "I Love Music" - 3:52
 "Searching For a Love" - 4:59
 "Where Do We Go From Here" - 3:39
 "When Will I See You Again" - 2:58
 "Show You the Way to Go" - 3:53
 "Wake Up Everybody" - 3:38
 "Dirty Old Man" - 4:14
 "If Only You Knew" - 4:21
 "Bring the Family Back" - 3:48
 "Don't Let Love Get You Down" - 3:50
 "Time to Get Down" - 2:45
 "Love Train" - 3:10

References

1998 albums
Sonia (singer) albums
Albums produced by Steve Levine